Keith Edward Barber (1944 – 1 February 2017) was a professor of physical geography at the University of Southampton. Barber specialized in palaeoecology, landscape and climate change, and human impact throughout the Quaternary. He retired in 2009.

References

External links
 University of Southampton staff page

Academics of the University of Southampton
British geographers
2017 deaths
1944 births
Date of birth missing
Physical geographers